The 2011 South African Figure Skating Championships were held at The Ice Station in Cape Town on 4–5 October 2010. Skaters competed in the disciplines of men's and ladies' singles.

Senior results

Men

Ladies

External links
 2011 South African Championships results

South African Figure Skating Championships, 2011
South African Figure Skating Championships
South African Figure Skating Championships, 2011